This article discusses the phonological system of standard Russian based on the Moscow dialect (unless otherwise noted). For an overview of dialects in the Russian language, see Russian dialects. Russian has 34 consonants, which can be divided into two types:
 hard or plain
 soft or palatalized

Russian also preserves palatalized consonants that are followed by another consonant more often than other Slavic languages do. Like Polish, it has both hard postalveolars and soft ones ( and marginally or dialectically ).

Russian has vowel reduction in unstressed syllables. This feature also occurs in a minority of other Slavic languages like Belarusian and Bulgarian and is also found in English, but not in most other Slavic languages, such as Czech, Polish, most varieties of Serbo-Croatian, and Ukrainian.

Vowels

Russian has five to six vowels in stressed syllables,  and in some analyses , but in most cases these vowels have merged to only two to four vowels when unstressed:  (or ) after hard consonants and  after soft ones.

Slovak).

The six-vowel view, held by the Saint-Petersburg (Leningrad) phonology school, points to several phenomena to make its case:
 Rare instances of word-initial , including the minimal pair  'to produce the sound ' and  'to produce the sound ы', as well as borrowed names and toponyms, like  , the name of a river and several villages in the Komi Republic.

The most popular view among linguists (and the one taken up in this article) is that of the Moscow school, though Russian pedagogy has typically taught that there are six vowels (the term phoneme is not used).

On the other hand, numerous alternations between the two sounds in Russian indicate clearly that at one point the two sounds were reanalyzed as allophones of each other.

Allophony 

Russian vowels are subject to considerable allophony, subject to both stress and the palatalization of neighboring consonants. In most unstressed positions, in fact, only three phonemes are distinguished after hard consonants, and only two after soft consonants. None of these mergers are represented in writing.

Front vowels 
Formant studies in  demonstrate that  is better characterized as slightly diphthongized from the velarization of the preceding consonant, implying that a phonological pattern of using velarization to enhance perceptual distinctiveness between hard and soft consonants is strongest before .

In native words,  only follows unpaired (i.e. the retroflexes and ) and soft consonants. After soft consonants (but not before), it is a mid vowel  (hereafter represented without the diacritic for simplicity), while a following soft consonant raises it to close-mid . Another allophone, an open-mid , occurs word-initially and between hard consonants.

In words borrowed from other languages,  often follows hard consonants; this foreign pronunciation usually persists in Russian for many years until the word is more fully adopted into Russian. For instance,  (from French chauffeur) was pronounced  in the early twentieth century, but is now pronounced .

Back vowels 

For most speakers,  is a mid vowel , but it can be a more open  for some speakers.

When unstressed,  becomes near-close; central  between soft consonants, centralized back  in other positions.

Unstressed vowels 

Russian unstressed vowels have lower intensity and lower energy.
  has merged with : for instance,  'bulwarks' and  'oxen' are both pronounced , phonetically .
  has merged with : for instance,  (lisá) 'fox' and  'forests' are both pronounced , phonetically .
  and  have merged with  after soft consonants: for instance,  (mésjats) 'month' is pronounced , phonetically .

The same applies for vowels starting a word.

As a result, in most unstressed positions, only three vowel phonemes are distinguished after hard consonants (and ), and only two after soft consonants ( and ). For the most part, Russian orthography (as opposed to that of the closely related Belarusian) does not reflect vowel reduction.

Vowel mergers 
In terms of actual pronunciation, there are at least two different levels of vowel reduction: vowels are less reduced when a syllable immediately precedes the stressed one, and more reduced in other positions.

The pronunciation of unstressed  is as follows:

 In the syllable immediately before the stress, when a hard consonant precedes:   ('ferry'),   ('grass').
 In absolute word-initial position.
  appears elsewhere, when a hard consonant precedes:   ('cloud').
 In absolute word-final position,  may occur instead, especially at the end of a syntagma.
 This merger also tends to occur after formerly soft consonants now pronounced hard, where the pronunciation  occurs. This always occurs when the spelling uses the soft vowel variants, e.g.   ('wife'), with underlying . However, it also occurs in a few word roots where the spelling writes a hard . Examples:
  'regret': e.g.   ('to regret'), к сожале́нию  ('unfortunately').
  'horse', e.g. ,  (pl. gen. and acc.).
  in numbers: e.g.   ('twenty [gen., dat., prep.]'),   ('thirty [instr.]').
   ('rye [adj. m. nom.]').
   ('jasmine').

There are a number of exceptions to the above vowel-reduction rules:
Across certain word-final inflections, the reductions do not completely apply.

Other changes 
Unstressed  is generally pronounced as a lax (or near-close) , e.g. ('man').

"be afraid yourself") may be pronounced with  instead of modern (and phonetically consistent) .

In weakly stressed positions, vowels may become voiceless between two voiceless consonants:   ('exhibition'),   ('because'). This may also happen in cases where only the following consonant is voiceless:   ('skull').

Phonemic analysis 
Because of mergers of different phonemes in unstressed position, the assignment of a particular phone to a phoneme requires phonological analysis. There have been different approaches to this problem:

The Saint Petersburg phonology school assigns allophones to particular phonemes.
The Moscow phonology school uses an analysis with morphophonemes (singular ). It treats a given unstressed allophone as belonging to a particular morphophoneme depending on morphological alternations, or on etymology (which is often reflected in the spelling). To make a determination, one must seek out instances where an unstressed morpheme containing  in one word is stressed in another word. If there are no alternations between stressed and unstressed syllables for a particular morpheme, then no assignment is made, and existence of a hyperphoneme is postulated.
Some linguists prefer to avoid making the decision. Their terminology includes strong vowel phonemes (the five) for stressed vowels plus several weak phonemes for unstressed vowels: thus,  represents the weak phoneme , which contrasts with other weak phonemes, but not with strong ones.

Diphthongs
In all contexts other than after a vowel,  is considered an approximant consonant. Phonological descriptions of  may also classify it as a consonant even in the coda. In such descriptions, Russian has no diphthongs.

The first part of diphthongs are subject to the same allophony as their constituent vowels. Examples of words with diphthongs:   ('egg'),   ('her' dat.),   ('effective').

Consonants
 denotes palatalization, meaning the center of the tongue is raised during and after the articulation of the consonant. Phonemes that have at different times been disputed are enclosed in parentheses.

 Notes
 Most consonant phonemes come in hard–soft pairs, except for always-hard  and always-soft  and formerly or marginally . There is a marked tendency of Russian hard consonants to be velarized or uvularized,  though this is a subject of some academic dispute. Its function is to make the contrast between hard and soft consonants perceptually more salient, and the less salient the contrast is otherwise (such as labial consonants being universally the most resistant to palatalization), the higher the velarization degree.
The dictionary of  prescribes soft pronunciation in these names.
  is generally listed among the always-hard consonants; however, certain foreign proper names, including those of Ukrainian, Polish, Lithuanian, or German origin (e.g. The phonemicity of a soft  is supported by neologisms that come from native word-building processes (e.g.).
  is also always soft. In today's most widespread pronunciation,  appears (instead of ) for orthographical  where  starts the root of a word, and -з/-с belongs to a preposition or a "clearly distinguishable" prefix (e.g.
 The marginally phonemic sound  is largely obsolete except in the more conservative standard accent of Moscow, in which it only occurs in a handful of words. Insofar as this soft pronunciation is lost, the corresponding hard  replaces it. This sound may derive from an underlying  or :  , modern . For more information, see alveolo-palatal consonant and retroflex consonant.
They also tend to be at least slightly labialized, including when followed by unrounded vowels.
 Hard  are laminal denti-alveolar ; unlike in many other languages,  does not become velar  before velar consonants.
 Hard  has been variously described as pharyngealized apical alveolar  and velarized laminal denti-alveolar .
 Hard  is postalveolar, typically a trill .
 Soft  is an apical dental trill , usually with only a single contact.
 Soft  are laminal alveolar . In the case of the first two, the tongue is raised just enough to produce slight frication as indicated in the transcription. Modern Russian tends to affricatize these sounds to [tʲsʲ], [dʲzʲ] as in Belarusian. This phenomenon is called «tsekanye».
 Soft  is either laminal alveolar  or laminal denti-alveolar .
  are dental , i.e. dentalized laminal alveolar. They are pronounced with the blade of the tongue very close to the upper front teeth, with the tip of the tongue resting behind the lower front teeth.
 The voiced  are often realized with weak friction  or even as approximants , particularly in spontaneous speech.
(Thus, there exists a minimal pair of homographs:   'aha!' vs   'agha'). (declension forms of   'God'),   'Lord' (especially in the exclamation   'Oh Lord!'),   'good'.
 Some linguists (like I. G. Dobrodomov and his school) postulate the existence of a phonemic glottal stop . This marginal phoneme can be found, for example, in the word  . Claimed minimal pairs for this phoneme include   'narrowed' (a participle from  'to narrow', with prefix  and root , cf.  'narrow') vs   'betrothed' (originally a participle from  'to judge', now an adjective; the root is  'court') and   'with Ann' vs   '(by) Alex'.

There is some dispute over the phonemicity of soft velar consonants. 'to Ivan'). Hard variants occur everywhere else. Exceptions are represented mostly by:
 Loanwords:
 Proper nouns of foreign origin:

The rare native examples are fairly new, as most them were coined in the last century:

In the mid-twentieth century, a small number of reductionist approaches made by structuralists put forth that palatalized consonants occur as the result of phonological processes involving  (or palatalization as a phoneme in itself), so that there were no underlying palatalized consonants. Despite such proposals, linguists have long agreed that the underlying structure of Russian is closer to that of its acoustic properties, namely that soft consonants are separate phonemes in their own right.

Voicing

Final devoicing
Voiced consonants (and ) are devoiced word-finally unless the next word begins with a voiced obstruent. In other words, their voiceless equivalent will be used (see table on the right).

Examples:
  (story, tale) sounds like расскас 
  (knife) sounds like нош 
  (Ivanov) sounds like Иваноф ; and so on.

This is related to the use of the marginal (or dialectal) phoneme  in some religious words .

Voicing elsewhere
Basically, when a voiced consonant comes before an voiceless one, its sound will shift to its voiceless equivalent (see table).

 Example:   (spoon) sounds like Лошка . 

That happens because ж is a voiced consonant, and it comes before the voiceless к.

The same logic applies when a voiceless consonant comes before a voiced one (except в). In this case, the sound of the former will change to its voiced equivalent.

 Example:  (to do) sounds like зделать [ˈzʲdʲeɫətʲ].

Russian features general regressive assimilation of voicing and palatalization. In longer clusters, this means that multiple consonants may be soft despite their underlyingly (and orthographically) being hard. The process of voicing assimilation applies across word-boundaries when there is no pause between words.
The voicing or devoicing is determined by that of the final obstruent in the sequence:   ('request'),   ('vodka').
 ) ('the creature')
  ('two')
  ('of light')
  ('star')

When  precedes and follows obstruents, the voicing of the cluster is governed by that of the final segment (per the rule above) so that voiceless obstruents that precede  are voiced if  is followed by a voiced obstruent (e.g.   'to the widow') while a voiceless obstruent will devoice all segments (e.g.   'without an admission').

Palatalization

Paired consonants preceding  are also soft; although there are exceptions from loanwords, alternations across morpheme boundaries are the norm. The following examples show some of the morphological alternations between a hard consonant and its soft counterpart:

Velar consonants are soft when preceding , and never occur before  within a word.

Before hard dental consonants, labial and dental consonants are hard:   ('eagle' gen. sg), cf.   ('eagle' nom. sg).

Assimilative palatalization 
Paired consonants preceding another consonant often inherit softness from it. This phenomenon in literary language has complicated and evolving rules with many exceptions, depending on what these consonants are, in what morphemic position they meet and to what style of speech the word belongs. In old Moscow pronunciation, softening was more widespread and regular; nowadays some cases that were once normative have become low colloquial or archaic. In fact, consonants can be softened to differing extents, become semi-hard or semi-soft.

The more similar the consonants are, the more they tend to soften each other.

Softening is stronger inside the word root and between root and suffix; it is weaker between prefix and root and weak or absent between a preposition and the word following.

Before soft dental consonants,  and often soft labial consonants, dental consonants (other than ) are soft.
 is assimilated to the palatalization of the following velar consonant) ('lungs' gen. pl.).
 Palatalization assimilation of labial consonants before labial consonants is in free variation with nonassimilation, such that  ('to bomb') is either  or  depending on the individual speaker.
 When hard  precedes its soft equivalent, it is also soft and likely to form a single long sound (see gemination). This is slightly less common across affix boundaries.

In addition to this, dental fricatives conform to the place of articulation (not just the palatalization) of following postalveolars) ('with a part'). In careful speech, this does not occur across word boundaries.

Russian has the rare feature of nasals not typically being assimilated in place of articulation. Both  and  appear before retroflex consonants) ('money' (scornful)) and  ) ('sanctimonious one' instr.). In the same context, other coronal consonants are always hard.

Consonant clusters
As a Slavic language, Russian has fewer phonotactic restrictions on consonants than many other languages, allowing for clusters that would be difficult for English speakers; this is especially so at the beginning of a syllable, where Russian speakers make no sonority distinctions between fricatives and stops. These reduced restrictions begin at the morphological level; outside of two morphemes that contain clusters of four consonants: встрет-/встреч- 'meet', and чёрств-/черств- 'stale', native Russian morphemes have a maximum consonant cluster size of three:

If  is considered a consonant in the coda position, then words like  ('quince') contain semivowel+consonant clusters.

Affixation also creates consonant clusters. Some prefixes, the best known being вз-/вс-, produce long word-initial clusters when they attach to a morpheme beginning with consonant(s) (e.g. ||+  || →   'flash'). However, the four-consonant limitation persists in the syllable onset.

Clusters of three or more consonants are frequently simplified, usually through syncope of one of them, especially in casual pronunciation. Various cases of relaxed pronunciation in Russian can be seen here.

Because prepositions in Russian act like clitics, the syntactic phrase composed of a preposition (most notably, the three that consist of just a single consonant: к, с, and в) and a following word constitutes a phonological word that acts like a single grammatical word.

In the syllable coda, suffixes that contain no vowels may increase the final consonant cluster of a syllable (e.g.  'city of Noyabrsk' ||+  || → ), theoretically up to seven consonants: *  ('of monsterships'). There is usually an audible release of plosives between these consecutive consonants at word boundaries, the major exception being clusters of homorganic consonants.

Consonant cluster simplification in Russian includes degemination, syncope, dissimilation, and weak vowel insertion. There are also a few isolated patterns of apparent cluster reduction (as evidenced by the mismatch between pronunciation and orthography) arguably the result of historical simplifications. For example, dental stops are dropped between a dental continuant and a dental nasal or lateral:   'flattering' (from   'flattery'). Other examples include:

Compare:   'solar, sunny',   'heart (adj.), cordial',   'Scotland',   'Marxist' (person).

The simplifications of consonant clusters are done selectively; bookish-style words and proper nouns are typically pronounced with all consonants even if they fit the pattern. For example, the word  is pronounced in a simplified manner  for the meaning of 'Dutch oven' (a popular type of oven in Russia) and in a full form  for 'Dutch woman' (a more exotic meaning). The orthographic combination  is pronounced  in the words  [ˈzdrastvʊj(tʲe)] 'hello',  [ˈt͡ɕustvə] 'feeling' (does not have related words with pronounced  in the modern language, so the first  in the spelling exists only for historical reasons),  [bʲɪzˈmoɫstvəvətʲ] 'to be silent', and related words, otherwise pronounced :  [bəɫɐfstˈvo] 'naughtiness'.

In certain cases, this syncope produces homophones, e.g.

Another method of dealing with consonant clusters is inserting an epenthetic vowel (both in spelling and in pronunciation),  after most prepositions and prefixes that normally end in a hard consonant. This includes both historically motivated usage (from historical extra-short vowel ) and cases of its modern extrapolations. There are no strict limits when the epenthetic  is obligatory, optional, or prohibited. One of the most typical cases of the epenthetic  is between a morpheme-final hard consonant and a cluster starting with the same or similar consonant. E.g.  'from Wednesday' ||+|| → , not *с среды;  'I'll scrub' ||+|| → , not *оттру. The interfix  (spelled  after soft consonants) is also used in compound words:  'oesophagus' (lit. food path) ||+|| → .

Stress 
Stress in Russian is phonemic and therefore unpredictable. It may fall on any syllable, and can vary drastically in similar or related words. For example, in the following table, in the numbers 50 and 60, the stress moves to the last syllable, despite having a structure similar to, say, 70 and 80: 

Words can also contrast based just on stress (e.g.   'ordeal, pain, anguish' vs.   'flour, meal, farina'). Stress shifts can even occur within an inflexional paradigm:   ('house' gen. sg., or 'at home') vs   ('houses'). The place of the stress in a word is determined by the interplay between the morphemes it contains, as morphemes may be obligatorily stressed, obligatorily unstressed, or variably stressed. 

Phonologically, stressed syllables are mostly realised not only by the lack of aforementioned vowel reduction, but also by a somewhat longer duration than unstressed syllables. More intense pronunciation is also a relevant cue, although this quality may merge with prosodical intensity. Pitch accent has only a minimal role in indicating stress, mostly due to its prosodical importance, which may prove a difficulty for Russians identifying stressed syllables in more pitched languages.

Supplementary notes 

There are numerous ways in which Russian spelling does not match pronunciation. The historical transformation of  into  in genitive case endings and the word for 'him' is not reflected in the modern Russian orthography: the pronoun   'his/him', and the adjectival declension suffixes -ого and -его. Orthographic г represents  in a handful of word roots: легк-/лёгк-/легч- 'easy' and мягк-/мягч- 'soft'.

( cites  and other instances of intervening prefix and preposition boundaries as exceptions to this tendency.)

 velarizes hard consonants:   ('you' sing.).  and  velarize and labialize hard consonants and labialize soft consonants:   ('side'),   ('(he) carried').  is a diphthong  or even a triphthong , with a closer lip rounding at the beginning of the vowel that gets progressively weaker, particularly when occurring word-initially or word-finally under stress.

A weak palatal offglide may occur between certain soft consonants and back vowels (e.g.  'thigh' ).

See also 
Help:IPA/Russian
Russian alphabet
Russian orthography
Reforms of Russian orthography
History of the Russian language
List of Russian language topics
Index of phonetics articles

References

Bibliography

Further reading

 

 

Russian language
Slavic phonologies